Les Gavarres or Massís de les Gavarres is a mountain massif in Catalonia, Spain. It is part of the Catalan Coastal Range. The highest point is Puig d'Arques, 532 m. Other important summits are Mare de Déu dels Àngels (485 m) and Santa Pellaia (353 m).

Geography
The mountains run broadly north-west, south-east in the Costa Brava region. They meet the sea between Castell-Platja d'Aro and Palamós. The range runs as far west as Girona. There are a number of villages in the mountains including Romanyà de la Selva and Santa Pellaia. The mountains also include the hermitage of Mare de Déu dels Àngels where there are views of both the Sea and Pyrenees.

The ranges of the Gavarres are generally formed from granite rock, an extension from the volcanic area around Olot. Most mountainsides are covered in a dense forest of cork oak, holm oak, pine and other vegetation. Much of the Gavarres is a nature reserve.

See also
Costa Brava

References

External links 

 Consorci de les Gavarres
 Floragavarres.net: Atles fotogràfic de la flora útil i medicinal de les Gavarres

Mountains of Catalonia